The 1997–98 Moldovan Cup was the seventh season of the Moldovan annual football cup competition. The competition ended with the final held on 27 May 1998.

Round of 16
The first legs were played on 7 March 1998. The second legs were played on 12 March 1998.

|}

Quarter-finals
The first legs were played on 1 April 1998. The second legs were played on 15 April 1998.

|}

Semi-finals
The first legs were played on 29 April 1998. The second legs were played on 13 May 1998.

|}

Final

Notes

References
 

Moldovan Cup seasons
Moldovan Cup
Moldova